Tehran Province ( Ostān-e Tehrān) is one of the 31 provinces of Iran.

At the time of the National Census of 2006, the province had a population of 13,281,858 in 3,729,010 households. The following census in 2011 counted 12,183,391 people in 3,731,480 households, by which time Karaj, Nazarabad, and Savojbolagh Counties had been separated from the province to become  Alborz province. The province was made a part of the First Region with its secretariat located in Tehran, upon the division of the provinces into 5 regions, solely for coordination and development purposes on June 22, 2014. According to the latest census in 2016, the population of the province had increased to 13,267,637 in 4,288,563 households.

Tehran province borders Mazandaran province in the north, Qom province in the south, Semnan province in the east, Alborz province in the west and Markazi province in the southwest. The metropolis of Tehran is the capital city of the province and of Iran.

Tehran province is the richest in Iran, as it contributes approximately 29% of the country's GDP. Furthermore, it houses approximately 18% of the country's population and is the most industrialized province in Iran, with nearly 94% of its residents living in the cities as of 2016.

The province gained importance when Tehran was claimed the capital by the Qajar dynasty in 1778. Today, Tehran, with a population of 8 million, is ranked amongst the 40 most populous metropolitan cities of the world.

History

Tehran province has several archeological sites indicating settlements dating back several thousand years. Until 300 years ago, Rey was the most prominent of the cities of the province. However, the city of Tehran rose to become the largest city and capital of Iran by 1778, and since then has been the political, cultural, economic, and commercial nucleus of Iran.

Tehran has over 1,500 historical sites of cultural significance registered with the Cultural Heritage Organization of Iran. The oldest of these in Tehran province is the remains of two sites in Firuzkuh County that date back to the fourth millennium BCE.

Geography
The province of Tehran has over 12 million inhabitants and is Iran's most densely populated region. Approximately 86.5 percent reside in urban areas and 13.5 percent in rural areas of the province.

The largest rivers of this province are Karaj River and Jajrood River.

Mountain ranges such as The Alborz span the north; Savad Kooh and Firooz Kooh are located in the northeast; Lavasanat, Qarah Daq, Shemiranat, Hassan Abad and Namak Mountains are in the southern areas; Bibi Shahr Banoo and Alqadr are situated in the southeast and the heights of Qasr-e-Firoozeh been located to the east of the province.

Environmentally, the climate of Tehran province is stable and has four seasons, in winter its experiences cold and snowy conditions, in spring and autumn it experiences generally mild conditions with ample rain, and in summer it experiences warm to hot conditions, and is generally dry. In the mountains, however, it is cold and semi-humid all year round, and the higher regions are colder with long winters. Tehran city has cold winters and warm to hot summers. On the whole, the province has a cold semi-arid, steppe climate in the south and an alpine climate in the north.

Administrative divisions

Cities 

According to the 2016 census, 12,452,230 people (nearly 94% of the population of Tehran province) live in the following cities: Abali 2,758, Absard 10,648, Ahmadabad-e Mostowfi 14,077, Andisheh 116,062, Arjomand 1,124, Baghestan 83,934, Baqershahr 65,388, Bumahen 79,034, Chahardangeh 49,950, Damavand 48,380, Eslamshahr 448,129, Fasham 6,945, Ferdowsieh 34,221, Ferunabad 21,682, Firuzkuh 17,453, Golestan 239,556, Hasanabad 43,922, Javadabad 4,844, Kahrizak 37,527, Kilan 2,882, Lavasan 18,146, Malard 281,027, Nasimshahr 200,393, Nasirshahr 28,644, Pakdasht 236,319, Parand 97,464, Pardis 73,363, Pishva 59,184, Qarchak 231,075, Qods 309,605, Robat Karim 105,393, Rudehen 28,533, Sabashahr 53,971, Safadasht 32,476, Salehabad 58,683, Shahedshahr 25,544, Shahriar 309,607, Sharifabad 18,281, Shemshak 3,423, Tehran 8,693,706, Vahidieh 33,249, and Varamin 225,628.

The following table shows the ten largest cities of Tehran province:

Tehran province today
Tehran is the commercial heart of Iran. Tehran province has over 17,000 industrial units employing 390,000 people, 26% of all units in Iran. The province contains 30% of Iran's economy, and comprises 40% of Iran's consumer market. The province has three hydro dams namely Latiyan, Lar, and Amir Kabir as well as two natural lakes, providing the water supply of Tehran and the province.

The province contains 170 mines, over 330 square kilometres of forests, and over 12800 square kilometres of pasture.

Generally speaking, year round, regions such as the southern slopes of the Alborz Mountains, especially in the mountains, valleys, and rivers and artificial lakes formed behind the great dams of Amir Kabir, Latiyan and Lar along with natural lakes of Jaban and Tarr provide considerable recreation for the province.

Moreover, due to excessive snowfall in the northern areas of the province during the winter season, the Alborz mountains form an excellent environment for winter sports such as skiing. Dizin, Shemshak, and Tochal are the most popular skiing resorts.

Transportation

Road transport

Tehran Province is covered with and connected to other provinces with a big Freeway and Expressway network:
  Freeway 2 (Tehran–Karaj Freeway): This freeway connects Tehran to the capital city of neighboring province of Alborz, Karaj and continues towards Tabriz and Europe.
  Freeway 5 (Tehran–Saveh Freeway): This Freeway connects city of Tehran to its southern suburbs such as Sabashahr, Robat Karim and Parand and continues towards Markazi Province to Saveh and Salafchegan. There are plans to continue the freeway towards Khuzestan.
  Freeway 7 (Tehran–Qom Freeway/Khalij-e-Fars (Persian Gulf) Freeway): This Freeway connects Tehran City to its airport, Imam Khomeini International Airport and continues towards Qom and Isfahan.
  Tehran–Pardis Freeway: This freeway connects Tehran City to its northeastern suburbs such as Pardis, Bumehen and Rudehen and joins Haraz Road and Firuzkuh Road.
  Tehran–Shomal Freeway: This under construction freeway will connect Tehran to Chalus and the touristic areas in Shomal.
  Makhsus Road: This road is the old road from Tehran to Karaj. Because trucks are not allowed on the freeway this road has a high congestion of trucks.
  Road 38: This road connects Tehran to Shahriar and Malard in southwestern Tehran and continues towards Buin-Zahra in Qazvin Province.
  Road 44: This Expressway connects Tehran to Mashhad.
  Road 65 (Saidi Expressway/Saveh Road): This road connects Tehran to its southern suburbs such as Chahardangeh, Eslamshahr and Golestan. It continues towards Saveh and further south towards Isfahan, Abadeh, Shiraz and finally the Persian Gulf coastal industrial city of Asaluyeh.
  Road 71 (Qom old Road): This road is the road that connected Tehran to Qom as a main road before the opening of the freeway in 1980. It is still an important transit road because trucks are not allowed in the freeway.
  (Damavand Road/Haraz Road): This road connects Tehran to cities like Rudehen, Abali and Damavand and continues towards Amol in Mazandaran province in Shomal. It is the most congested road from Tehran to Shomal after Chalous Road.
  Road 79 (Firuzkuh Road): This road connects Tehran to Firuzkuh and Qaemshahr and therefore Sari.
 Greater Tehran Expressway Network:

Rail network

National Rail Network
The city of Tehran is connected to the North, South, West and East with the railway. It has weekly trains for Istanbul. Tehran is the headquarters of RAJA (Iran national railway). There may be plans to build high speed railway lines from Tehran to Mashhad and Isfahan.

Tehran Metro

Tehran is served by a system of metro of three urban lines (1, 2, 4) and one suburban line (5) serving Karaj and Tehran western suburbs. There are plans to extend the system to eight urban lines and express express suburban lines.

Airports
Tehran Province has two main passenger airports:

 Mehrabad Airport
 Imam Khomeini Airport

It also has a number of air force bases.

Parks, recreation and other attractions

Darband (hiking trail)
Chitgar Park
Mellat Park
Laleh Park
Jamshidieh Park
Niavaran Park
Sa'ei Park
Shatranj Park
Tangeh Savashi
Police Park
Darabad hiking trail
Darakeh hiking trail
Jahan-e Kudak Park
Azadi Sports complex
Enghelab Sports Complex and Golf course
Eram Amusement Park
Several caves, springs, and waterfalls outside Tehran
Latyan Lake
Lavizan Forest Park
Vard-Avard Forest Park
Khojir National Park
Kavir National Park
Tar Lake
Amir Kabir Lake
Lar Protected Natural Habitat
Varjeen Protected Natural Habitat

Religious centers

Mosques, shrines, mausoleums, and tombs
Soltani Mosque, built by Fath Ali Shah
Atiq Mosque, built in 1663.
Mo'ezz o-dowleh mosque, built by Fath Ali Shah
Haj Seyd Azizollah mosque, built by Fath Ali Shah
Al-javad mosque, Iran's first modernist design mosque.
The Old Sepahsalar mosque, another prominent Qajar era mosque.
The new Sepahsalar Mosque (Madreseh e Motahari)
Filsuf o-dowleh Mosque, Qajar era
Moshir ol-Saltaneh Mosque, Qajar era
Mo'ayyer ol-Mamalik Mosque, Qajar era
Shahr Banu Mausopleum
Javan-mard Qassab Mausoleum, a pre-Islamic semi-mythical hero
Dozens of Imam-zadeh shrines, hundreds of years old, including that of Imam Zadeh Saleh.
Dozens of Saqa Khanehs: traditional places of prayer
Several Tekyehs: traditional places for mourning Muharram ceremonies for Husayn ibn Ali.
Ebn-e Babooyeh cemetery, where numerous Iranian figures, such as Takhti and Ali Akbar Dehkhoda, are buried.
Zahir o-dowleh cemetery, housing the tombs of art and cultural figures such as Iraj Mirza, Mohammad Taghi Bahar, Forough Farrokhzad, Abolhasan Saba, Ruhollah Khaleghi, and Darvish-khan are buried.
Kordan Tomb, Seljuqi era, Karaj.
Maydanak Tomb, 13th century, Karaj
The Polish cemetery north of Tehran, where numerous Western Allied soldiers of World War II are buried

Churches
Surep Georg Church, 1790
Thaddeus Bartoqimus Church, 1808
Enjili Church, 1867
Assyrian Church

Higher education 

Tehran province's major universities are:

 Shariaty Technical College
 Allameh Tabatabaii University
 Amirkabir University of Technology (Tehran Polytechnic)
 Alzahra University
 Shamsipour Technical College
 Baqiyatallah Medical Sciences University
 Farabi Institute of Virtual Higher Education
 Iran University of Science and Technology (IUST)
 Imam Hossein University
 Imam Sadeq University (ISU)
 Iran University of Medical Sciences
 K.N.Toosi University of Technology
 Shahed University
 Shahid Beheshti University
 Sharif University of Technology
 Tarbiat Modarres University (Professor Training University)
 Tehran University of Medical Sciences
 Tarbiat Moaalem University
 University of The Arts
 University of Social Welfare and Rehabilitation Sciences
 University of Tehran
 Islamic Azad University of Tehran-Science and Research
 Islamic Azad University of Pishva
 Islamic Azad University of Islamshahr
 Islamic Azad University of Damavand
 Islamic Azad University of Roodehen
 Islamic Azad University of Tehran-Medical Sciences
 Islamic Azad University North Tehran Branch
 Islamic Azad University of Tehran-South
 Islamic Azad University Central Tehran Branch
 Shahid Beheshti University of Medical Sciences
 Institute for Studies in Theoretical Physics and Mathematics (IPM)
 Hadith College of Tehran
 Imam Ali University for Army Officers
 Comprehensive University of Technology
 Tehran University of Applied Science and Technology
 Bagher Aloloum University
 Iran College of Tele-communications
 Medical University for the Islamic Republic of Iran's Army
 NAJA University of Police
 School of Economic Affairs (SEA)
 School of International Relations
 Shahed University of Medical Sciences
 Shahid Sattari University of Aeronautical Engineering
 University of Islamic Sects
 The Research Institute of The Petroleum Industry
 Iran Polymer and Petrochemical Institute
 Power and Water Institute of Technology(PWIT)
 Payame Noor University

See also
 Architecture of Tehran
 Economy of Iran
 Tehran (city)

References

External links

 Official website of Tehran Governorship
 Tehran Province's Cultural Heritage Organization
 

 
Geography of Tehran
Provinces of Iran